Mark Kean (born June 22, 1988 in Innerkip, Ontario) is a Canadian curler from Woodstock, Ontario. He currently skips his own team out of Ottawa.

Career
Kean's junior career involved winning the provincial junior mixed title in 2009. Kean made a quick transition to men's curling winning the provincial Colts trophy in 2010 and in 2011 playing in his first provincial tournament. At the 2011 provincial championship, his rink finished with a 3-7 record.

As preparation for the 2011 provincial, the Kean rink played in their first Grand Slam of Curling event, at the 2011 BDO Canadian Open of Curling, where they went winless (0-5).

Kean qualified for his second provincial championship in 2012 posting a 3-7 record. The rink also played in two Grand Slam events that season, the 2011 World Cup of Curling where they went 0-5 and the 2011 BDO Canadian Open of Curling where they won their first game (defeating John Epping) in a Grand Slam event, going 1-4

The Kean rink played in the 2012 The Masters Grand Slam of Curling where they again were win less, going 0-5. However, in their second Grand Slam of the season, the 2012 Canadian Open of Curling, not only did they win a game, they went all the way to the semi-final where they lost to provincial rival Glenn Howard. The team then went 1-4 at the 2013 National, and were again win less at the 2013 Players' Championship. The next season, the Kean rink played in the 2013 Canadian Olympic Curling Pre-Trials, where they were eliminated after losing all three of their games. The team found success again at the 2013 Canadian Open, where they lost in the quarter-finals. Kean left the team mid-season.

Team Kean, that was newly formed with vice Mathew Camm, second David Mathers and lead Scott Howard only 11 months before the tournament, won the 2015 Ontario Tankard. They finished the round robin in first-place, going 8-2, before ultimately defeated John Epping's Team Epping in the finals 7-6 in 10 ends.

Team Kean participated in the 2015 Tim Horton's Brier, going 5-6 and finishing out of the playoffs.

The team disbanded in the off-season after 2015 and forfeited the right to return to the Ontario Tankard to Team Epping.

In 2016, Kean formed a new squad with former Canadian Junior Champion Jake Walker and CIS Champions Spencer Nuttall and Fraser Reid.

Personal life
Kean is married to fellow competitive curler Mallory Kean (née Buist). They have two children, Parker and Kaleigh.

He founded the dye-sublimation clothing brand Runback in June 2013 and he currently manages the day-to-day operations.

In July 2016, Mark and Mallory became Owners/City Managers for ShopWoodstock.com, a business powered by the ShopCity.com platform.

Grand Slam record

References

External links

 TeamKean.ca

People from Woodstock, Ontario
Living people
1988 births
Curlers from Hamilton, Ontario
Canadian male curlers
21st-century Canadian people